Southampton Township may refer to:

 Southampton Township, New Jersey
 Southampton Township, Bedford County, Pennsylvania
 Southampton Township, Cumberland County, Pennsylvania
 Southampton Township, Franklin County, Pennsylvania
 Southampton Township, Somerset County, Pennsylvania

See also 
 Southampton (disambiguation)
 Lower Southampton Township
 Upper Southampton Township

Township name disambiguation pages